The Ashburton County Rugby Union was formed in 1904 and was originally affiliated to the South Canterbury Union, before being affiliated to the Canterbury Union as a sub-union from 1905 to 1926. Full status was granted in 1927, and the name of the union changed to the Mid Canterbury Rugby Football Union in 1952.

References

Defunct New Zealand rugby union governing bodies
Sport in Ashburton, New Zealand
Sports organizations established in 1904
1904 establishments in New Zealand
1952 disestablishments in New Zealand